Up Cerne is a hamlet lying to the west of the River Cerne between Minterne Magna and Cerne Abbas in Dorset, England. It was the birthplace of John Mount Batten.

The settlement is centred around the 17th Century Up Cerne Manor but also includes a number of smaller thatched cottages. Public footpath access to the hamlet is via the Wessex Ridgeway which also forms part of the local Cerne Valley Way.

References

External links

Villages in Dorset
Civil parishes in Dorset
West Dorset District